Bertrand Moulinet (born 6 January 1987 in Toulouse) is a French racewalker. He competed in the 20 km walk at the 2012 Summer Olympics, where he placed eighth, and in the 50 km walk where he placed 11th.

Doping
On 30 March 2015 Moulinet tested positive for the HIF inhibitor FG-4592. He admitted doping after the French police had searched his flat and interrogated him. He subsequently received a four-year ban from sport.

References

External links 
 
 
 

1987 births
Living people
French male racewalkers
French sportspeople in doping cases
Olympic athletes of France
Athletes (track and field) at the 2012 Summer Olympics
Sportspeople from Toulouse
Doping cases in athletics